Gallatin County is the name of three counties in the United States:

Gallatin County, Illinois 
Gallatin County, Kentucky 
Gallatin County, Montana